Barry Rhodes (born 12 February 1987) is a New Zealand cricketer. He played in four List A matches for Wellington in 2011.

See also
 List of Wellington representative cricketers

References

External links
 

1987 births
Living people
New Zealand cricketers
Wellington cricketers
Sportspeople from Port Elizabeth